Niní is an Argentine children's telenovela. Produced by Florencia Bertotti and her ex-husband Guido Kaczka together with Endemol and Telefe Contenidos. It is written by Gabriela Fiore and Jorge Chernov. It was aired from September 7, 2009, Monday through Thursday by Telefe at 6 pm. It stars Florencia Bertotti and Federico Amador. Co-starring the actress Maida Andrenacci. With the antagonistic participation of Paula Morales and Esteban Meloni.

Plot 
Niní tells the story of Nina Gómez, an innocent girl, somewhat distracted, spontaneous and with a big heart, who has been left alone with her grandfather, the gardener of the embassy in which they live. The life of Nina it is altered with the arrival of the new ambassador, Tomás Parker (Federico Amador), an orderly and distant man. Tomás Parker arrives at the mansion accompanied by his ambitious secretary Celina Martínez Paz (Paula Morales) and his four adopted children, who, having been born in different countries, form a heterogeneous and very particular family. Niní, who quickly becomes fond of the kids, she must overcome several obstacles to be able to remain in the embassy next to them. To the point that she ends up disguising herself as a man and becoming Nicolás, the new ambassador's driver. Niní will fall madly in love with Tomás just like he does with her. From now on a delicious plot begins to develop where Niní, with its simplicity and brightness, will reach the heart of the Parkers, transmitting values that neither power nor money can get, freedom, love and a sense of humor outside of the usual. But things will get complicated when Nicolás appears, who is actually Niní disguised as a man.

Cast 
 Florencia Bertotti as Nina "Niní" Gómez/Nicolás Zampanó
 Paula Chaves as Violeta Barranco
 Brenda Gandini as Jazmín
 Sofía Zámolo as Tamara
 Juan Pablo Urrego as Tony
 Federico Amador as Tomás Parker
 Juan Manuel Guilera as Martín Parker
 Melanie Chong as Chow Parker 
 Sheyner Cristian Díaz Gómez as Chama Chan Parker 
 Iara Muñoz as Sicilia Parker 
 Néstor Zacco as Máximo Parker
 Paula Morales as Celina Martínez Paz
 Esteban Meloni as Víctor Martínez Paz
 Maida Andrenacci as Victoria Acuña 
 Mario Moscoso as George Mc Gruster
 Héctor Díaz as Horacio Raymundi
 Vanesa Butera as Carmen Juárez 
 Giselle Bonaffino as Lola Benítez
 Sebastián Mogordoy as Ángel Espósito 
 Esteban Masturini as Juan Espósito 
 Diego Gentile as Sebastián Gallardo 
 Pablo Napoli as Hector Gómez 
 Paula Sartor as Sofía Anzoátegui 
 Antonia Bengoechea as Zoe Anzoátegui 
 Valentín Villafañe as Abel López 
 Fernando Sureda as Diego de la Fuente
 Ernesto Claudio as Dt. Bartoli
 Emilio Bardinas Juan Alberto
 Marta Paccamicci as Lupe 
 Natalia Jascalevich as Thais
 Adriana Ferrer as Adelfa 
 César Bordón as Abdel
 Victoria Tortora as Carla
 Leonardo Saggese as Alejandro
 Irene Goldszer as Lorena

Soundtrack 
The soundtrack for the series was released On November 9, 2009. The CD is called Arriba las ilusiones. The CD contained video clips for two of the songs and included a gift poster. Within a few weeks of its release it had received its first gold record for sales. All the songs are performed by Florencia Bertotti.

International Broadcasters

Américas 
 : Telefe Internacional
 : Caracol
 : Canal 4 
 : Telesistema
 : Ecuavisa
 : Canal 3
 : Tiin
 : Televicentro
 : Televisora Nacional
 : Paravisión
 : La Tele, Red Global and ATV Sur
 : Canal 4

Europe 
 : Disney Channel Bulgaria
 : Disney Channel Italy
 : Disney Channel
 : Boomerang , TCM and Disney Channel Romania
 : Disney Channel Ukraine

Awards and nominations

Theater
Niní was adapted to theater in a play called Nini, The Search. All the characters were featured on stage singing and dancing the songs from the original show. The play made its debut on January 24, 2010, in Mar del Plata. The second showing took place on February 27, 2010 in the Orfeo Superdome in Córdoba. More than 5,500 people attended the show. The run ended its season at the Gran Rex theater in Buenos Aires, with over 35,000 people in attendance.

The show was also presented for the first time in Florence, Italy in November 2010.

Legal dispute
In 2010, producer Gustavo Yankelevich filed a plagiarism lawsuit on behalf of RGB Entertainment and Cris Morena Group, alleging that Niní was a copy of the telenovela Floricienta, which Bertotti starred in during the 2004-2005 TV season. The Argentinian courts ruled in favor of the complainants, and Niní was pulled off the air on April 16, 2010, despite earlier reports of an agreement between the two parties. The double-episode ending drew record ratings.

References

External links 
 Official website of the series 
 Opening of Niní on Youtube

2009 telenovelas
Argentine telenovelas
2009 Argentine television series debuts
2000s Argentine television series
2010s Argentine comedy television series
Telefe telenovelas
Spanish-language telenovelas
Spanish-language television shows